The World Wrestling All-Stars (WWA) International Cruiserweight Championship was the cruiserweight championship for the Australian based wrestling promotion World Wrestling All-Stars.

History
The WWA International Cruiserweight Championship was first won by Juventud Geurrera by defeating Psicosis on October 19, 2001 in Perth, Australia. The title was vacated to be up for grabs on the company's first PPV, The Inception. The title was then won again by Juventud Guerrera. The title was unified with the TNA X Division Championship on May 25, 2003.

Title history

Combined reigns

See also
Professional wrestling in Australia
Championship unification
TNA X Division Championship

References

External links
WWA International Cruiserweight Championship on Solie Title Histories

Cruiserweight wrestling championships
World Wrestling All-Stars championships
Professional wrestling in Australia
International professional wrestling championships